The Nutty Squirrels is a children's album by Don Elliott and Granville Alexander "Sascha" Burland under the name Nutty Squirrels. The album was released in 1959 by Hanover, a label owned by Bob Thiele and Steve Allen. The song "Uh! Oh! Part-2" reached the Top 20.

Track listing

Side one
"Uh! Oh! Part-1" - 2:14
"Uh! Oh! Part-2" – 2:19
"Ding Dong" – 2:08
"Something Like That" – 2:08
"Jumping Bean" – 1:5
"Nutty" – 2:15

Side two 
"Uh-Huh" – 2:29
"Salt Peanuts" – 2:15
"Eager Beaver" – 2:02
"Bang!" – 2:02
"Nutcracker" – 2:05
"Zowee" – 2:05

Personnel
 Don Elliott
 Granville Alexander "Sascha" Burland
 Al Caiola – guitar
 Don Arnone – guitar
 Jack Six – double bass
 Ronnie Bedford – drums

References

1959 albums
Don Elliott albums
The Nutty Squirrels albums